The 1923–24 season was the 27th in the history of the Western Football League.

After a period of two to three years in which many clubs left the league, this season marked the start of a period of growth. The champions this season were newcomers Lovells Athletic.

Final table
Four new clubs joined the league this season, and the number of clubs increased from nine to eleven after Hanham Athletic and Welton Rovers left the league.

Lovells Athletic
Minehead
Paulton Rovers, rejoining after leaving in 1922
Poole

References

1923-24
1923–24 in Welsh football
1923–24 in English football leagues